Nigel Clarke may refer to:

 Nigel Clarke (composer) (born 1960), British composer and musician.
 Nigel A. L. Clarke (born 1971), Jamaican politician

See also
 Nigel Clark (born 1966), English singer and musician of the band Dodgy
 Nigel Clark (pentathlete) (born 1956), British modern pentathlete